Ekaterina Stratieva (born 5 October 1982) is a rally driver from Bulgaria who competed in WRC Rally Bulgaria 2010. In 2014 and 2015 she was European Ladies Rally Champion.

Her co-driver in 2015 is Yulianna Nyirfas.

See also
List of female World Rally Championship drivers

External links
WRC results (eWRC)

Rally drivers
Bulgarian racing drivers
1982 births
Living people
Place of birth missing (living people)
Saintéloc Racing drivers
Female racing drivers
European Rally Championship drivers